Besu Sado Beko (born 12 January 1996) is an Ethiopian athlete competing in middle-distance events. She represented her country at the 2015 World Championships in Beijing reaching the semifinals. In addition, she won the silver medal at the 2015 African Games.

International competitions

Personal bests
Outdoor
1000 metres – 2:37.73 (Hengelo 2015)
1500 metres – 3:59.47 (Zürich 2016)
Indoor
1500 metres – 4:10.15 (Ghent 2015)
One mile – 4:39.27 (Stockholm 2016)

External links

1996 births
Living people
Ethiopian female middle-distance runners
World Athletics Championships athletes for Ethiopia
Athletes (track and field) at the 2015 African Games
Place of birth missing (living people)
Athletes (track and field) at the 2016 Summer Olympics
Olympic athletes of Ethiopia
African Games silver medalists for Ethiopia
African Games medalists in athletics (track and field)
21st-century Ethiopian women